Drunken Hero is a 2002 Chinese wuxia television series which tells a story of two brothers who were separated at birth, raised differently, and forced to become rivals. The series starred Vincent Zhao, Max Mok, Kristy Yang and Yang Ruoxi in the lead roles.

Plot
Wentian and Wanxin are the sons of the Jianwen Emperor of the Ming dynasty. They were separated at birth when the emperor's uncle, Zhu Di, launched a coup to seize the throne from his nephew. The emperor forced Wentian and Wanxin to consume the magical Water and Fire orbs respectively and ordered his bodyguards to bring the infant princes out of the palace before he disappeared mysteriously. In the midst of the chaos, Wanxin was taken away by the eunuch Chu Tianxing, who serves Zhu Di, while Wentian was delivered to safety by the bodyguards.

Wentian was raised by Mi Jiutou, one of the bodyguards, and he grows up to become a gregarious martial artist who values friendship and righteousness. On the other hand, Wanxin, who was raised as Chu Tianxing's godson, develops a cruel, cold and power-hungry personality under the influence of his evil godfather. The orbs in their bodies often cause them to experience strange fits of agony — Wentian suffers from chills while Wanxin feels like he is on fire. However, their prowess in inner energy have also increased due to the power of the orbs.

Wentian and Wanxin meet each other by coincidence and strike up a friendship, becoming sworn brothers in the process and without knowing each other's true identities. Both Wentian and Wanxin fall in love with Bai Yutong, a maiden from a wealthy family who disguises herself as "Golden Swallow", a bandit who robs the rich to help the poor. Xiaowan, Mi Jiutou's daughter, is also in love with Wentian. Their love relationships become more complicated. Wentian and Wanxin eventually realise that they are actually brothers.

In a dramatic twist of events, Wanxin is castrated on his godfather's order. He becomes emotionally scarred and gradually becomes consumed by his darker personality. After Chu Tianxing is killed by an enemy, Wanxin takes over his godfather's place and follows in the latter's brutal and ruthless ways. Meanwhile, Wentian masters a set of martial arts, based on different styles of Drunken Fist, with each style named after a type of alcoholic drink. The warm effect of alcohol helps him to suppress the cool energy from the Water Orb, relieving him of his agony. He roams the jianghu as a youxia to uphold justice and help the poor with his new skills, earning himself the nickname of "Drunken Hero". At the end of the series, Wentian faces Wanxin in a final fight to put an end to his brother's rampage.

Cast
 Vincent Zhao as Wentian
 Kristy Yang as Bai Yutong
 Max Mok as Wanxin
  as Mi Xiaowan
 Li Yongyong as Honggu
  as Hua Nongying / Yu Linglong
  as Hua Canyi
  as Tong Buda
 Liang Jing as Shui Linling
 Zhu Yana as Hua Kui
 Zhang Wei as Chu Tianxing
 Xie Yunshan as Choupidan

External links
 

Chinese wuxia television series
2002 Chinese television series debuts
Television series set in the Ming dynasty
Mandarin-language television shows
Television series set in the 15th century